WLUI (670 kHz AM) is an oldies radio station broadcasting in Lewistown, Pennsylvania and serving State College, Pennsylvania. It also can be heard in northern parts of Maryland and parts of southern New York state, as well as parts of eastern Pennsylvania.

The daytime-only station previously operated a news/talk format featuring Joy Browne, Glenn Beck, Rush Limbaugh, and Sean Hannity.

History
Originally WMRF, the station signed on in June, 1941 with 250 Watts on 1490 kHz.  The Call Letters stood for the initials of the last name of the ownership at the time.  Just after World War II, Lewistown Broadcasting Company expanded, applying for an FM in Lewistown and an AM and eventually an FM in Altoona, Pa.

In Lewistown, the FM station was granted and constructed as WLTN-FM on 97.9.   The transmitter site for WMRF was moved to the WLTN-FM site in Derry Township (Big Ridge) just north of Lewistown to provide for an economical operation as at the time a licensed engineer was required to be on duty when the station was on the air.  The FM operation was not financially viable and in 1954 the License was turned back to the FCC.  In 1964, the FCC came out with a new allocation table, which included 95.9 for Lewistown, PA.  The company applied and received a grant for 95.9 MHz, which signed on as 100% simulcast of WMRF in 1964.   WMRF-FM used the original WLTN-FM building but operated from a 60' telephone pole instead of mounting on the WMRF-FM tower.  The old WLTN-FM Antenna remained in place until the original tower was dismantled in 1981.

In 1980, the tower was replaced with a taller tower to provide better coverage for FM..  It also gave WMRF a 5/8 wave tower which had a significant improvement to its coverage.

In 1985, the call letters were changed to WIEZ (EZ-1490) as programming on WMRF-FM and WIEZ were now separated.

In 1988, WIEZ applied to move to 670 at 5.4 KW daytime and give up the 1490 full-time frequency.   After the move in 1989, the format was initially oldies, then news/talk, which lasted until January 3, 2017.

On January 3, 2017, WIEZ changed their format from news/talk to oldies, branded as "Big Lewie", with new WLUI calls already put into place on January 2, 2017, and a new simulcast on FM translator W225CK 92.9 FM Lewistown.

References

External links

LUI
Oldies radio stations in the United States
Radio stations established in 1941
1941 establishments in Pennsylvania
LUI